Petra Schersing (née Müller, born 18 October 1965 in Quedlinburg) is a retired East German sprinter who specialised in the 400 metres. She represented sports club SC Chemie Halle and was coached by Harold Werner. At the 1988 Olympic Games in Seoul, she won a silver medal in the 400 metres and a bronze medal in the 4×400 metres relay.

Biography
As Petra Muller, she first achieved international recognition, when she became the 1983 European Junior Champion at 400 metres. She also won a gold medal in the 4 × 400 m relay.

In 1986, at the European Indoor Championships, she won a silver medal behind teammate Sabine Busch. Later that year at the European Championships in Stuttgart, she won a bronze medal in the individual 400 metres and a gold medal in the relay, with teammates Kirsten Emmelmann, Sabine Busch and Marita Koch.

At the 1987 World Indoor Championships in Indianapolis, she surprisingly failed to reach the final. At the 1987 World Championships in Rome she won a silver medal in the 400 m behind Olga Bryzgina as well as another relay gold medal alongside Dagmar Neubauer, Emmelmann and Busch.

Muller won her biggest individual title in 1988, when she became the European Indoor Champion in 50.28 secs, which at the time ranked her fourth on the indoor all-time list. At the 1988 Olympics she won the silver medal in the 400 m, between Soviets Olga Bryzgina (gold) and Olga Nazarova (bronze). She also won the bronze medal in the 4 × 400 m relay, with teammates Neubauer, Emmelmann and Busch.

In 1990, now competing as Petra Schersing, she won a silver medal at the European Championships in Split, finishing behind her teenage teammate Grit Breuer and won a gold medal in the relay, with new teammates Manuela Derr, Annett Hesselbarth and Breuer.

Schersing's personal best time in the 400 metres is 49.30 seconds, achieved in June 1988 in Jena, which at that time placed her tenth on the all-time list. She won the East German National 400 m title three times (1986–1988) and twice won the East German indoor 400 m title (1986, 1988).

As of 2013, Schersing's Outdoor best (49.30) is 21st on the World all-time list and third on the German all-time list, only behind Marita Koch and Sabine Busch., while her indoor best (50.28) is tenth on the World indoor all-time list and second on the German indoor all-time list, behind Sabine Busch.

In October 1988, she married fellow Olympic sprinter Mathias Schersing.

International competitions

References

1965 births
Living people
East German female sprinters
Athletes (track and field) at the 1988 Summer Olympics
Olympic athletes of East Germany
Olympic silver medalists for East Germany
Olympic bronze medalists for East Germany
World Athletics Championships medalists
European Athletics Championships medalists
World Athletics Championships athletes for East Germany
People from Quedlinburg
Sportspeople from Saxony-Anhalt
Medalists at the 1988 Summer Olympics
Olympic silver medalists in athletics (track and field)
Olympic bronze medalists in athletics (track and field)
21st-century German politicians
World Athletics Championships winners
21st-century German women